Viola riviniana, the common dog-violet, is a species of flowering plant in the family Violaceae, native to Eurasia and Africa. It is also called wood violet and dog violet. It inhabits woodland edges, grassland and shady hedge banks.  It is found in all soils except those which are acid or very wet.

Viola riviniana was voted the county flower of Lincolnshire in 2002, following a poll by the wild plant conservation charity Plantlife.

Distribution
Common in  Ireland and all the British Isles.

Wildlife value
It is the food plant of the pearl bordered fritillary, small pearl-bordered fritillary, silver-washed fritillary and high brown fritillary butterflies.

It is a known host of the pathogenic fungus Puccinia violae.

Similar species
 Viola odorata (sweet violet) – fragrant; all the leaves are located at the base of the plant; stipules are gland-tipped
 Viola canina (heath dog violet) – clear blue flowers; narrower leaves; smaller teeth on the stipules
 Viola palustris (marsh violet) – found in wet places; leaves are kidney-shaped; grows from underground creeping stems; dark-veined flowers; stipules without teeth
 Viola labradorica (alpine violet) – V. riviniana is sometimes sold by nurseries as V. labradorica

Hybrids
This species hybridises with early dog-violet (V. reichenbachiana) to produce Viola × bavarica.

References

Further reading
 Partridge, James (2007) Viola × bavarica: the punctual Dog-violet BSBI News 106:8–9 (illustrated with colour photographs on inside back cover of this edition)

External links

riviniana
Flora of Europe
Flora of Finland
Flora of Sweden
Flora of Russia
Flora of Great Britain
Flora of the United Kingdom
Taxa named by Ludwig Reichenbach